"Momma's Place" is a song by Irish recording artist Róisín Murphy, released as a digital single on 18 January 2010.

On 5 January 2010, after finding out the song had leaked to the Internet, Murphy commented on it via Facebook, saying: "I hear there has been a leak of Momma's Place. Oh dear, I am all for the freedom of the internet, it's just that the quality control is sometimes a little amiss... and I'm funny about stuff like that. The rip that is available is not up to scratch." She later uploaded a high-quality version of the track onto her own MySpace and Facebook pages, making its official premiere.

On 25 March 2010, it was announced that Perez Hilton would be teaming up with Murphy and Indaba Music for a "Momma's Place" remix contest. For the contest, fans were allowed to download multiple stems of the song in order to create their own version.

Track listing 
"Momma's Place" – 4:27
"Momma's Place" (Bongo Boys Remix) – 6:16
"Momma's Place" (Kanji Kinetic Remix) – 4:50
"Momma's Place" (Shake Aletti Remix) – 4:06

Charts

References

2010 singles
Róisín Murphy songs
2009 songs